No Resting Place was a 1951 British motion picture directed by Paul Rotha, produced by Colin Lesslie Productions, and starring Michael Gough, based on Ian Niall's 1948 novel. It is noteworthy for its early use of location shooting and for bringing the acting style of Dublin's Abbey Theatre to the screen, as well as being the fiction feature debut of director Paul Rotha and cinematographer Wolfgang Suschitzky.

Production
It was the first fiction film directed by Rotha, formerly a documentary maker. The film draws on Rotha's documentary background as well as Italian neo-Realism, with scenes of rural and domestic life particularly showing the influence of his documentaries. It was made for a low budget of 60,000 GBP.

It was shot entirely on location in Wicklow, Ireland by cinematographer Wolfgang Suschitzky. It was the first film as cinematographer for Suschitzky, who went on to photograph films including Get Carter.

The soundtrack was by William Alwyn, using a small ensemble of traditional Irish instruments: harp, flute, and violin.

Apart from stars Michael Gough and Noel Purcell, Rotha drew the cast from Irish theatres including the Abbey Theatre and Irish radio.  It is regarded by some critics as part of an Abbey school of filmmaking that aimed to mimic the realism of contemporary mainland-European film.

Plot
Gough plays an Irish Traveller who is relentlessly pursued by a policeman (Mannigan, played by Noel Purcell) after accidentally killing a gamekeeper.

Critical reaction
Ian Johnson praises moments of touching emotional clarity but criticises "inept scripting" and a poor ending, probably imposed by censors.

Monthly Film Bulletin praised the authenticity of its depiction of tinker life, while finding the figure of the pursuing civil guard Mannigan to be less convincing. The Manchester Guardian applauded the truthfulness of its depiction of the Irish countryside and Gough's performance, and commended it for a more truthful portrayal of Ireland than the traditional stage Irish cliches, while suggesting it could do with a bit more poetry.

Awards
At the 1952 British Academy Film Awards, it was nominated for Best Film from any Source and Best British Film.

References

External links

Films directed by Paul Rotha
1951 films
Films scored by William Alwyn
Films based on British novels
British drama films
1951 drama films
British black-and-white films
1950s British films